Janesville Consolidated Community School District (JCSD) is a rural public school district operating a single Pre-Kindergarten through 12th grade public school in Janesville, Iowa.

Brian J. "BJ" Meaney is currently the superintendent of schools and has been since he began the 2013–14 school year as superintendent after being hired in April 2013 by the Janesville school board.

It occupies portions of Black Hawk and Bremer counties, including the town of Janesville.

Schools
The district operates two schools in a single facility in Janesville:
 Janesville Elementary School
 Janesville Junior-Senior High School

Janesville High School

Athletics
The Wildcats compete in the Iowa Star Conference, including the following sports:

Cross County 
Volleyball
 5-time Class 1A State Champions (2013, 2015, 2016, 2017, 2018)
Football
Basketball 
Track and Field 
Baseball 
Softball

Janesville students can also participate in wrestling and soccer with Waverly-Shell Rock.

The Janesville volleyball program won the 1A State Volleyball Championship in the state of Iowa four consecutive years from 2015 to 2018.  They also won the state championship in 2013. The program qualified for the state tournament for a streak of nine years, spanning from 2010 through the 2018 season.

Enrollment

See also
List of school districts in Iowa
List of high schools in Iowa

References

External links

Education in Bremer County, Iowa
Education in Black Hawk County, Iowa
School districts in Iowa